Shubhangi Gokhale (born 2 June 1968) is an Indian Marathi and Hindi theatre, film and television actress. She is the wife of late Hindi/Marathi actor Mohan Gokhale who played the title role on the Doordarshan show Mr Yogi. She has completed more than 300 shows of the popular play Sakhar Khallea Manus along with Prashant Damle, and has had roles in film and television. She is currently playing the role of Kusumavati Dhale-Patil in Colors Marathi's Raja Rani Chi Ga Jodi and Shaku Khanwilkar in Zee Marathi's Yeu Kashi Tashi Me Nandayla.

Early life and career
Shubhangi Gokhale was born in Khamgaon as Shubhangi Sangwai. Her father was a district judge while her mother was a housewife. Because her father's job required him to move around, the family relocated several times and lived in Jalna,  Malkhapur, Buldhana and several other districts in Maharashtra. She did her schooling at various locations and was interested in reading books and participated in debates and other competitions at the school level. She took part in a play while she was attending a government college in Aurangabad. Besides being an actor, she is also a writer and has written a number of short stories and articles. Her best known roles were as Mishri Mausi in Lapataganj and as Shyamla in Shriyut Gangadhar Tipre. In her 2018 play, Sakhar Khallela Manus, she acted with Prashant Damle.

Personal life
Shubangi was married to Mohan Gokhale until his death in 1999. Together, they acted in a television miniseries Mr. Yogi. She took a break of around ten years from television and theatre after her marriage. After her husband's death, she made a comeback with the television serial Shriyut Gangadhar Tipre.

She has one daughter, Sakhi Gokhale who is also an actress.

Selected filmography

Films

Television

Plays
 Soor Rahu De
 Sakhar Khallela Manus

References

External links
 

1968 births
Marathi actors
Actresses in Marathi theatre
Actresses in Marathi cinema
20th-century Indian actresses
21st-century Indian actresses
Living people
Actresses from Mumbai